Javier Sánchez (born 26 November 1947) is a Mexican former footballer who competed in the 1968 Summer Olympics.

References

1947 births
Living people
Mexican footballers
Association football defenders
Olympic footballers of Mexico
Footballers at the 1968 Summer Olympics
Cruz Azul footballers